Malcolm Justin Marx (born 13 July 1994) is a South African professional rugby union player for the South Africa national team and the Kubota Spears in the Japanese Top League.

Youth and Varsity rugby 

He played for them at the 2007 Under-13 Craven Week competition and the 2010 Under-16 Grant Khomo Week competition.

During his schooling, Marx attended King Edward VII School in Johannesburg. Marx was included in a South Africa Academy side in 2011 and, following the 2012 Under-18 Craven Week competition, he was named in the South Africa Schools side and played against France and England in August 2012.

Marx was also a regular for the  side during the 2013 Under-19 Provincial Championship competition. He was also named as the Golden Lions U19 Forward of the Year for his displays.

Marx was included in the South Africa Under-20 side for the 2014 IRB Junior World Championship.

Golden Lions / Lions 

Marx was also included in the  Super Rugby squad for the 2014 Super Rugby season.

After a stellar 2017 for the Lions, Marx picked up a number of awards for the Lions including Super Rugby Player of the Year, Supporters Player of the Year, Players Player of the Year and Most Valued Player of the Year. Marx continued this form into the 2018 Super Rugby season, finishing the competition as the Lions' top try-scorer of the year and he is now the join top try scorer (27) in Lions history, a record he shares with current team mates Courtnall Skosan and Lionel Mapoe.

South Africa 'A' 

In 2016, Marx was included in a South Africa 'A' squad that played a two-match series against a touring England Saxons team. He came on as a replacement in their first match in Bloemfontein, but ended on the losing side as the visitors ran out 32–24 winners. He then started the second match of the series, a 26–29 defeat to the Saxons in George.

Springboks

2016-2017 
Marx was first selected for the Springboks for the 2016 Rugby Championship, making three appearances for his country during 2016. Marx made his debut for the Springboks on 17 September 2016, the same date as team mate Francois Louw's 50th test. Marx replaced Springbok captain Adriaan Strauss in the 43rd minute, but had a disappointing debut, with South Africa losing to New Zealand 13-41. Marx earned his first start for the Springboks on 5 November 2016, putting a 51-minute performance into a 31-31 draw against the Barbarians Club, prior to being replaced by Bongi Mbonambi.

After a series of outstanding performances for the Lions, Marx became a regular starter for South Africa in 2017. On 10 June 2017, he was named man of the match for his performance in the first of three tests against the French. Although his performance against New Zealand in the third round of the 2017 Rugby Championship was highly criticised, Marx performed to a world-class level throughout most of the competition and played in every test of the competition, with South Africa finishing in third place. Marx was not subbed off in either test against Australia during the competition, a rare feat for a hooker, the first test of which a 23-23 draw and the second test against Australia being a 27-27 draw. Marx lost out on winning Man of the Match to Australian back Kurtley Beale on both occasions.

Marx took his international career to new heights on 7 October 2017, with his performance against New Zealand becoming much-talked about and publicised, arguably his best individual performance to date. The performances of Marx, as well as fellow forwards Steven Kitshoff and newly-appointed Springbok Captain Eben Etzebeth allowed South Africa to compete well against the All Blacks, with Marx making four turnovers and many tackles on defence, also setting up replacement loose forward Jean-Luc du Preez for a try and scoring the final try of the game. Marx's try was converted by Lions teammate Elton Jantjies to make the final score a narrow 24-25 loss to the All Blacks. Marx completed his 2017 rugby season by appearing in three of the four Springbok tests during the 2017 end-of-year rugby union internationals.

In 2017 Marx scooped a number of awards, he was voted SA Rugby Player of the Year and SA Rugby Young Player of the Year. He was also voted South African Super Rugby Player of the Tournament.

2019 Rugby World Cup 
Marx was named in South Africa's squad for the 2019 Rugby World Cup. South Africa went on to win the tournament, defeating England in the final.

International tries

References

External links

 

South African rugby union players
Living people
1994 births
Rugby union players from Germiston
Alumni of King Edward VII School (Johannesburg)
Golden Lions players
Lions (United Rugby Championship) players
South Africa Under-20 international rugby union players
South Africa international rugby union players
Rugby union hookers
Urayasu D-Rocks players
Kubota Spears Funabashi Tokyo Bay players